WRMD-CD, virtual channel 49 (UHF digital channel 30), is a low-power, Class A Telemundo owned-and-operated television station licensed to Tampa, Florida, United States. The station is owned by the Telemundo Station Group subsidiary of NBCUniversal. WRMD-CD's studios are located on West Spruce Street in Tampa, and its transmitter is located near Riverview, Florida.

History
The station first signed on the air on October 29, 1987, originally broadcasting on UHF channel 57 as an affiliate of Channel America. Shortly afterward, the station was acquired by ZGS Communications, which converted the station into the Tampa Bay market's new Telemundo affiliate. WRMD originally broadcast on UHF channel 57 until the early 2000s, when the station relocated to UHF channel 49, to make room for WTTA (channel 38)'s new digital signal on channel 57. In 2004, the station began to be carried on Bright House Networks' cable systems in portions of the Tampa Bay market outside of Tampa proper.

On December 4, 2017, NBCUniversal's Telemundo Station Group announced its purchase of ZGS' 13 television stations, including WRMD-CD.

Local programming
Before it launched its own newscasts, WRMD aired simulcasts of WKAQ-TV newscasts from San Juan, Puerto Rico, along with weather forecasts from Orlando sister station WTMO-CD. The station launched a weekday-only news operation on September 9, 2014, and currently runs newscasts at 6 p.m. and 11 p.m. The station also airs Spanish-language Florida Lottery drawings. On August 14, 2011, the station debuted its first locally produced program, a lifestyle and entertainment magazine program titled Holaciudad teve!, which airs Sundays at 6 p.m.
 
On June 11, 2018, six months after the purchase by NBCUniversal, the station launched two half-hour afternoon newscasts at 5 and 5:30 p.m. in addition to the 6 p.m. show.

Subchannels
The station's digital signal is multiplexed:

References

External links

Telemundo Station Group
TeleXitos affiliates
LX (TV network) affiliates
Hispanic and Latino American culture in Tampa, Florida
RMD-CD
Low-power television stations in the United States
RMD-CD
Television channels and stations established in 1990
1990 establishments in Florida